Osage Township is a township in Henry County, in the U.S. state of Missouri.

Osage Township takes its name from the Osage River.

References

Townships in Missouri
Townships in Henry County, Missouri